Jannis Niewöhner (born 30 March 1992) is a German actor known for his role in the Timeless trilogy of films: Ruby Red, Sapphire Blue, and Emerald Green, based on a book series written by Kerstin Gier. He has appeared in more than twenty films since 2002.

Selected filmography

Awards

References

External links

 
 

1992 births
Living people
People from Krefeld
German male film actors
German male television actors
21st-century German male actors